This is a list of notable people of Armenian Azerbaijani descent.

Art 
 Ashig Alasgar – 19th-century poet and folk singer
 Mirza Gadim Iravani – Azeri painter of the mid-19th century
  – Armenian Soviet film scholar, critic, writer and drama, Honored Artist of the Armenian SSR (1975)
 Said Rustamov – Azerbaijani composer and conductor
 Huseyn Seyidzadeh – Azerbaijani film director

Scientists 
 Ahliman Amiraslanov – Azerbaijani physician
 Heydar Huseynov – Azerbaijani philosopher
 Mustafa Topchubashov – prominent Soviet surgeon and academician, Chairman of the Supreme Soviet of Azerbaijan SSR (1953–1955 and 1967–1971), Hero of Socialist Labor

Politicians 
 Ismat Abbasov – Minister of Agriculture of Azerbaijan (since 2004)
 Avaz Alakbarov – Azerbaijani economist, Minister of Finance of Azerbaijan (1999–2006)
 Aziz Aliyev – People's Commissariat for Health of the Azerbaijan SSR (1939–1941), Secretary of the Dagestan Regional Committee of the Communist Party (1942–1948)
 Ogtay Asadov – Speaker of the National Assembly of Azerbaijan (since 2005)
 Zulfi Hajiyev – Deputy Prime Minister of Azerbaijan, Member of Azerbaijani Parliament
 Nariman Imranov – Minister of National Security of Azerbaijan (1992–1993) (:ru:Имранов, Нариман Шамо оглы)
 Khalaf Khalafov – Deputy Minister of the Foreign Affairs Ministry
 Garib Mammadov – Chairman of State Land and Cartography Committee of Azerbaijan Republic
 Husein Mammadov – Chairman of the Supreme Council of Nakhchivan ASSR (1952–1964)
 Misir Mardanov – Minister of Education of Azerbaijan (since 1998)
 Shahin Mustafayev – Minister of Economic Development of Azerbaijan (since 2008)
 Hidayat Orujov – Azerbaijani writer and ambassador to Kyrgyzstan
 Hasan Seyidov – Minister of Agriculture of the Azerbaijan SSR (1955–1959)
 Mammad agha Shahtakhtinski – Azerbaijani linguist and public figure
 Akbar agha Sheykhulislamov – Minister of Agriculture of Azerbaijan Democratic Republic (1918–1920)
 Ali Insanov – Minister of Health of Azerbaijan (1993–2005)

Sports 
 Ramazan Abbasov – Azerbaijani football player
 Rovshan Huseynov – Azerbaijani boxer
 Khagani Mammadov – Azerbaijani football player

Military 
 Mehdi Abbasov – National Hero of Azerbaijan
 Shovgiyar Abdullayev – National Hero of Azerbaijan
 Asad Ahmadov – National Hero of Azerbaijan
 Agil Guliyev – National Hero of Azerbaijan
 Etibar Hajiyev – National Hero of Azerbaijan
 Farhad Humbatov – National Hero of Azerbaijan
 Miralakbar Ibrahimov – National Hero of Azerbaijan
 Fakhraddin Jabrayılov – National Hero of Azerbaijan
 Eldar Khalilov – National Hero of Azerbaijan
 Sakhavat Maharramov – National Hero of Azerbaijan
 Sahil Mammadov – National Hero of Azerbaijan
 Khydyr Mustafayev – Hero of the Soviet Union
 Yahya Rahim Safavi – Major General, Chief commander of AGIR (1997–2007)
 Habib bey Salimov – Major-General of Azerbaijan Democratic Republic (:ru:Салимов, Габиб-бек)
 Mehman Sayadov – National Hero of Azerbaijan

Others 
 Firudin Agayev – Hero of Socialist Labor

References 

Azerbaijani
Armenia
Azerbaijani